Mircea cel Bătrân National College is a high school located at 6 Ștefan cel Mare Street, Constanța, Romania. It was founded as a gymnasium on September 1, 1896 and took the name of Mircea the Elder in 1901.

It is one of the most appreciated high schools in the country, constantly appearing in the top 10 schools ordered by admission grades and having students who achieved very good results at national and International Science Olympiads.

Faculty and Alumni

Faculty
 
 Nicholas Georgescu-Roegen
 Murat Iusuf

Alumni
 Haig Acterian
 
 Pavel Chihaia
 
 
 
 Lucian Grigorescu
 Stere Gulea
 Ion Jalea
 
 Pericle Martinescu
 
 Vasile Moldoveanu
 Krikor Pambuccian
 Alexandru Pesamosca
 Ion Marin Sadoveanu
 
 Harry Tavitian

References

External links
 Official site

Schools in Constanța
National Colleges in Romania
Educational institutions established in 1896
1896 establishments in Romania